The Cethana Power Station is a conventional hydroelectric power station located in north-western Tasmania, Australia.

Technical details
Part of the MerseyForth scheme that comprises seven hydroelectric power stations, the Cethana Power Station is the fifth station in the scheme. The power station is located underground and is supplied with water from Lake Cethana, the Wilmot Power Station located below Lake Gairdner, and uncontrolled flow from the Forth River. Water from the station is returned to the Forth River through a tailrace tunnel which has a tailrace gate structure at the outlet portal.

The station output, estimated to be  annually, is fed to the outdoor switchyard via a three single-phase 13.8 kV/220 kV Fuji generator transformer.

Engineering heritage 
Cethana Dam is listed as a National Engineering Landmark by Engineers Australia as part of its Engineering Heritage Recognition Program.

See also

 List of power stations in Tasmania

References

Energy infrastructure completed in 1981
Hydroelectric power stations in Tasmania
Northern Tasmania
Recipients of Engineers Australia engineering heritage markers